Rom, Afghanistan is a village in Sar-e Pol Province in northern Afghanistan.

See also
 Sar-e Pol Province

References

External links
Satellite map at Maplandia.com

Populated places in Sar-e Pol Province